Eamonn O'Brien may refer to:

 Eamonn O'Brien (Gaelic football manager) (born 1960), former manager of Meath
 Eamonn O'Brien (footballer) (born 1990), Irish football midfielder
 Eamonn O'Brien (mathematician), mathematician in New Zealand
 Eamonn O'Brien (politician), British Labour politician and leader of Bury Metropolitan Borough Council